Athletics was contested at the 1951 Asian Games in National Stadium, New Delhi, India from 8 March to 11 March.

Medalists

Men

Women

Medal table

Participating nations

References
Asian Games Results. GBR Athletics. Retrieved on 2014-10-04.
Women's relay medallists. Incheon2014. Retrieved on 2014-10-04.
Men's relay medallists. Incheon2014. Retrieved on 2014-10-04.

 
1951 Asian Games events
1951
Asian Games
1951 Asian Games
1951 Asian Games